Lissi Dancefloor Disaster are a Swedish experimental electropop group which consists of Josefin Lindh and Johan Tilli. They were named after Johen's cat Lissi. Their debut album, Waves, was released on 27 February 2013. Johan is also a member of Swedish indie pop group Death Team. The group have been on hiatus since 2014.

Discography

Studio albums

Singles

Extended plays

Music videos

See also
Death Team

References

External links
 

2008 establishments in Sweden
Musical groups established in 2008
Electropop groups
Musical groups from Uppsala